Court Hill Historic District is a historic district located in Ottumwa, Iowa, United States.  It is a residential area of large homes with a few small homes in between.  The district was listed on the National Register of Historic Places in 1998 as a part of Ottumwa MPS. At the time of its nomination it contained 84 resources, which included 56 contributing buildings, two contributing structures, 25 non-contributing buildings, and one non-contributing site.

History
Court Street was developed as a major artery from the Des Moines River to Sixth Street, which was Ottumwa's original city limits, where it made a slight turn to the north and headed up a bluff and into the countryside above the river valley. It is possible that it is the road established by the Iowa Territorial Legislature in 1844 that extended from the southern Davis County border to the northern Wapello County border and connected the two county seats.  Later it was signed as U.S. Highway 63.  The oldest houses in the district were built between 1865 and 1875.  The first electric streetcar began operating on Court Street in 1889. The street was paved with bricks in 1890 and 1891. Both projects led to increased development of the area between 1890 and 1915. From this period until 1942 a centralized steam heat system was available in the city and the main pipes were located under Court Street. Because of this, the street was never covered with snow or ice during the winter and people could always climb to the top of the bluff when other streets were impassable.  During the World War II years many of the large homes were divided into multi-family dwellings. That process started to be reversed in the late 20th century when historic preservation took root in Ottumwa.

Architecture
Most of the houses are large in size, but a few smaller houses are scattered throughout the district. While some of the houses have been altered over the years, most of them retain a high level of integrity. Very few of the original buildings in the district have been torn down, and therefore, there is little in the way of new construction. A variety of the most fashionable Victorian styles were built in the district. The most popular include Italianate, Neoclassical, and Queen Anne. Architects who have designs in the district include George Kern, Edward Clark, and Fisher & Lowrie.

References

Historic districts on the National Register of Historic Places in Iowa
Historic districts in Wapello County, Iowa
National Register of Historic Places in Wapello County, Iowa
Buildings and structures in Ottumwa, Iowa